Below is a list of compositions by Josef Bohuslav Foerster sorted by genre, opus number, date of composition, original and English titles.

Lists of compositions by composer